Morteza Kermani-Moghaddam, a.k.a. Mojtaba Kermani-Magham, is an Iranian former footballer. He is currently the assistant coach of Paykan. His nickname is the 'Iranian bebeto'.

Honours

Club
Persepolis
Asian Cup Winners' Cup (1): 1990–91
Iranian Football League (1): 1995-96
Hazfi Cup (2): 1987-88, 1991–92
Tehran Provincial League (3): 1987-88, 1988–89, 1990–91

Al-Ittihad (Al-Gharafa)
Qatari League (1): 1991-92
Qatar Emir Cup (1): 1994-95

National
Iran
Asian Games Gold Medal (1): 1990

Individual
Best Foreign Player Qatari League

References

fifa.com
https://web.archive.org/web/20081211034239/http://persepolis.blogfa.com/8504.aspx

Living people
Iranian footballers
Iran international footballers
Persepolis F.C. players
Association football midfielders
Al-Gharafa SC players
Keshavarz players
Asian Games gold medalists for Iran
1988 AFC Asian Cup players
1992 AFC Asian Cup players
1965 births
Asian Games medalists in football
Footballers at the 1990 Asian Games
Qatar Stars League players
Medalists at the 1990 Asian Games